Kashkevar may refer to:

Kashkevar, Markazi
Kashkevar, Qazvin